The Judy's were a Pearland, Texas-based punk and new wave band that flourished from the late 1970s through the early 1980s.

History 
The Judy's song, "Guyana Punch", recounted the infamous Jonestown massacre. Several of their songs were topical: "Dogs" refers to the Son of Sam murderer; "Radiation Squirm" refers to the Three Mile Island accident; "How's Gary" refers to the execution of convicted killer Gary Gilmore; and "Vacation in Tehran" refers to the Iranian hostage crisis, among others. On December 1, 2007, The Judy's announced the opening of their own label and website, Wasted Talent Records. On this website, the albums Moo and Washarama were released on CD and vinyl, having been previously available only on vinyl and cassette tape.

Original personnel 
The band was founded by four Pearland High School students: Sam Hugh Roush (a guitar, vocals) (Pearland '80), David B. Bean, (songwriter, vocals, guitars, keyboards) (Pearland '80), Dane Cessac (né Dane Urshel Cessac; born 1962) (Pearland '80), drums, vocals, and Jeff Walton (Pearland '81) (bass, vocals). Roush, while a senior in high school, died January 9, 1980, from a one-car accident near his home while driving home from school band practice.  days earlier, The Judy's had recorded its debut single, "Teenage Hangups." Sam's father, an educator in the Houston Public Schools, was a former musician in the Air Force Band at Connally Air Force Base in Waco, Texas. After Roush's death, The Judy's continued as a trio.

After The Judy's first disbanded, Bean, in 1983, recorded a solo EP album titled Modomusic and Walton, in 1983, recorded a solo album titled Danger Boy. Both Bean and Walton continue to make music professionally.

Discography

Filmography 
The 1988 film, Married to the Mob, used the song "Ghost in a Bikini," composed by David Dean from The Judy's 1985 Moo album.

Documentary 
The Judy's is a short 2003 documentary on YouTube by Louis Black of The Austin Chronicle.

Bibliography

Annotations

Notes

References

External links

Interview with Jeff Walton, bass (June 2007)
Houston Press: Feature Article on The Judy's

Punk rock groups from Texas
Musical groups from Houston
People from Pearland, Texas